Alfredo is a given name.

Alfredo may also refer to:

Alfredo (album), by Freddie Gibbs and The Alchemist, 2020

Alfredo (footballer, born 1946), Brazilian footballer 
Alfredo II (Alfredo dos Santos, 1920–1997), Brazilian footballer 
Alfredo Ramos (Brazilian footballer) (1924–2012), Brazilian footballer known as Alfredo

See also
Fettuccine Alfredo, an Italian pasta dish